Myrrh is a natural gum or resin extracted from a number of small, thorny tree species of the genus Commiphora.

Myrrh may also refer to:
 Abyssinian myrrh (Commiphora habessinica), a shrub or tree
 African myrrh (Commiphora africana), a deciduous tree
 Myrrh, a common name of cicely, a perennial plant in the celery family
 Myrrh (album), by Robin Williamson (1972)
 Myrrh Records, an American Christian music record label

See also
 Gold, frankincense and myrrh, the gifts of the Biblical Magi
 Gold, Frankincense and Myrrh, a 1971 Croatian film
 Myrrha (disambiguation)
 Myrrhbearers, the individuals mentioned in the New Testament who were directly involved in the burial of Jesus or who discovered the empty tomb
 Myrrh-streaming, a title of some Eastern Orthodox saints
 Opopanax (perfumery), or sweet myrrh